Coonville Creek is a stream in St. Francois County in the U.S. state of Missouri.

Coonville Creek was so named on account of raccoons near its course.

See also
List of rivers of Missouri

References

Rivers of St. Francois County, Missouri
Rivers of Missouri